The Ardal Leagues are a football league in Wales. The word "ardal" translates as "district" in English, with Wales split into four regions at this level. They have clubs with amateur/semi-professional status and sit at the third level of the Welsh football league system. The first year of their operation would have been 2020–21 but the 2020–21 Ardal North East season, 2020–21 Ardal North West season, 2020–21 Ardal South East season and 2020–21 Ardal South West season were all cancelled. The inaugural season was moved to 2021–22. The creation of the leagues mark the first time the Football Association of Wales owns and is administering tier 3 of the Welsh league system. These changes follow from a review of the Welsh football pyramid. To be eligible clubs need to meet the criteria for FAW tier 3 certification.

The league is split into two leagues, covering North and South Wales. Both Northern and Southern leagues have two regionally-based sections of sixteen clubs each:

Ardal Northern
 Ardal North East (2022–23 Ardal NE season)
 Ardal North West (2022–23 Ardal NW season)
Ardal Southern
 Ardal South East (2022–23 Ardal SE season)
 Ardal South West (2022–23 Ardal SW season)

The winners of each league are promoted to either the Cymru North or the Cymru South as long as they meet the FAW's tier 2 certification criteria. Subject to also meeting these criteria, the four runners-up clubs enter play-off matches with two of the clubs also gaining promotion (one from the north and one from the south).

The Ardal Leagues structure replaced the former tier 3 leagues: Welsh Football League Division One, Mid Wales Football League Division One, Welsh Alliance League Division One and the Welsh National League Premier Division, leagues based in South Wales, Mid Wales, North West Wales and North East Wales respectively.

Relegation from the Ardal Leagues is to six local tier 4 leagues, with three clubs relegated from each of the tier 3 leagues at the end of the season. The tier 4 leagues are run by each of the Area Associations of Welsh football, the West Wales Football Association, the South Wales Football Association, the Gwent County Football Association, the Central Wales Football Association, the North East Wales Football Association and the North Wales Coast Football Association.

Ardal League teams 
On 10 July 2020 the FAW confirmed the 64 teams in the new tier 3 leagues. In an attempt to avoid dividing the current Mid-Wales teams across all four leagues, the North-East league contains a large contingent of the Mid-Wales teams. The North-West league contains the sides near the North Wales coast. After confirmation of their inclusion STM Sports announced on 27 July that they had folded, leaving only 15 sides in the South West league. On 3 August it was confirmed that Cardiff Draconians  had been promoted from the South Wales Alliance League to fill the remaining place in the league.

Since COVID-19-originated restrictions were put in place by the FAW, as from 10 August, clubs could have trained in groups of 15 and contact training would have been allowed at all-levels of football.  However, competitive and exhibition matches were still not allowed to take place. Consequently, the FAW decided to cancel what was to be the Ardal Leagues' inaugural 2020–21 season on 4 February 2021, and on 26 March, Montgomery Town withdrew from the North East league for pandemic-related reasons. They were replaced by Cardiff Draconians, as the highest placed team from the Alliance League who had been awarded a licence.

2022–23 season 
The following clubs are league members for the 2022–23 season.

Ardal NE 
Berriew (resigned July 2022)
Bow Street
Builth Wells
Caersws
Cefn Albion
Corwen
Dolgellau Athletic
Llandrindod Wells
Llanfair United
Llangollen Town
Llanrhaeadr
Llanuwchllyn
Machynlleth (withdrew July 2022)
Penycae
Rhos Aelwyd
Rhayader Town
Welshpool Town

Ardal NW 
Bangor 1876
Bodedern Athletic (resigned Dec 2022)
Brickfield Rangers
Denbigh Town
Flint Mountain
Hawarden Rangers
Llandudno Albion
Llangefni Town
Llanrwst United
Llay Welfare
Nantlle Vale
Rhostyllen
Rhydymwyn (resigned Sept 2022)
Rhyl 1879
Saltney Town
Y Felinheli

Ardal SE 
Abertillery Bluebirds
Blaenavon Blues
Brecon Corries
Caldicot Town
Chepstow Town
Croesyceiliog
Goytre
Lliswerry
Monmouth Town
Newport City
Risca United
RTB Ebbw Vale
Tredegar Town
Treowen Stars
Trethomas Bluebirds
Undy Athletic

Ardal SW
AFC Llwydcoed
Baglan Dragons
Caerau Ely
Cardiff Draconians
Cefn Cribwr
Cwmamman United
Dinas Powys
Garden Village
Mumbles Rangers
Penrhiwceiber Rangers
Penydarren BGC
Pontyclun
Port Talbot Town
Seven Sisters Onllwyn
Treharris Athletic
Ynysygerwn

League champions, runners-up/promotion play-off finalists, relegated teams, and Fair Play winners

Ardal NE

Ardal NW

Ardal SE

Ardal SW

Promotion play-offs

Ardal NE and Ardal NW

Ardal SE and Ardal SW

Applicants for FAW Tier 3 Certification 
For the 2020–21 season 93 clubs applied for FAW tier 3 Certification. 84 clubs were successful in their applications.

See also
List of association football competitions
Mid Wales Football League
Welsh Alliance League
Welsh Football League
Welsh National League (Wrexham Area)

References

External links
  Ardal Northern twitter
  Ardal Southern twitter
 Ardal Northern Leagues
 Y Clwb Pêl-droed

 
2
2020 establishments in Wales
Sports leagues established in 2020
Third level football leagues in Europe